Metamynoglenes is a genus of South Pacific dwarf spiders that was first described by A. D. Blest in 1979.

Species
 it contains eight species:
Metamynoglenes absurda Blest & Vink, 2002 – New Zealand
Metamynoglenes attenuata Blest, 1979 – New Zealand
Metamynoglenes flagellata Blest, 1979 – New Zealand
Metamynoglenes gracilis Blest, 1979 – New Zealand
Metamynoglenes helicoides Blest, 1979 – New Zealand
Metamynoglenes incurvata Blest, 1979 (type) – New Zealand
Metamynoglenes magna Blest, 1979 – New Zealand
Metamynoglenes ngongotaha Blest & Vink, 2002 – New Zealand

See also
 List of Linyphiidae species (I–P)

References

Araneomorphae genera
Linyphiidae
Spiders of New Zealand